Cardiaphyllum is an extinct genus of prehistoric corals. Species are found in the Upper Carboniferous of China.

See also 
 List of prehistoric hexacoral genera

References 

Prehistoric Hexacorallia genera
Rugosa
Carboniferous animals of Asia